GG Bond: Guarding is a 2017 Chinese computer-animated fantasy adventure comedy film directed by Lu Jinming and Zhong Yu. The film is part of the GG Bond film series, following 2015's GG Bond Movie: Ultimate Battle. It was released in China by Le Vision Pictures on 7 January 2017.

Plot
The legendary G-Watch has the magical power to protect the world. However, it chooses GG Bond as its master, who is regarded as nobody by everyone. Just at that time, Mysterio shows up, aiming to destroy all G-Watches. GG Bond fights against Mysterio fearlessly with his wit and courage, but finds that Mysterio is the grown-up himself coming from the future world!

Cast
Jackson Yee
Chen Yi
Zhang Zikun
Rong Yan
Zhuang Chengsong
Li Taicheng
Liu Qingyang
Chan Chi Wing

Reception
The film has grossed  in China.

References

Chinese animated films
Chinese animated fantasy films
Animated comedy films
Animated adventure films
Chinese fantasy comedy films
Le Vision Pictures films
2017 computer-animated films
2010s adventure comedy films
2010s fantasy comedy films
Animated films based on animated series
2017 comedy films